Buiki is a village located in the Myadzyel Raion, Minsk Region of Belarus.

References 

Villages in Belarus